Blue Sky was the flag carrier of Armenia and a charter airline based in Yerevan. The airline was operating for Mahan Air.

Fleet
3 Boeing 747-400 (operated for Mahan Air, all stored at Tehran)
1 Airbus A310-300

References

External links

Defunct airlines of Armenia
Airlines established in 2003
Airlines disestablished in 2008
Defunct charter airlines
Armenian companies established in 2003